King's Highway 101, commonly referred to as Highway 101, is a provincially maintained highway in the Canadian province of Ontario. The  highway connects Highway 17 west of Wawa with Highway 11 in Matheson before continuing east to the Ontario–Quebec border where it becomes Route 388. The highway forms one of the only connections between the two routes of the Trans-Canada Highway between Nipigon and Temagami, and crosses some of the most remote regions of Northern Ontario. Major junctions are located with Highway 129 near Chapleau and Highway 144 southwest of Timmins, though the distance between these junctions is significant.

Highway 101 was first assumed in 1940, though it was not given a numerical designations until 1944. The route initially connected Timmins with Highway 11. In the 1950s and 1960s, it was extended east to the Quebec border and west to the newly opened Highway 17 over Lake Superior. The highway reached its maximum length in 1967, and remained unchanged until 1997, when a section through Timmins was transferred to the responsibility of that city.

Route description 

Highway 101 begins in the west at Highway 17 near the town of Wawa and the village of Michipicoten, within Algoma District. Initially proceeding north, the route quickly turns eastward in Wawa and enters the barren expanses of the boreal forest, travelling through uninhabited wilderness for much of its journey across the Canadian Shield. From that junction, Highway 101 travels south for several kilometres before resuming its east–west orientation. Just east of The Shoals Provincial Park, the highway crosses the Laurentian Divide, the boundary between the Great Lakes and Arctic Ocean watersheds; a sign and a small picnic area mark the transition. Approximately midway between Wawa and Chapleau, the route enters Sudbury District, through which it continues most of the distance to Timmins.

Prior to entering the town, Highway 101 branches eastward, passing north of Chapleau Airport and resuming its course through the wilderness. Midway between Chapleau and Timmins, the route passes the village of Foleyet. It briefly travels through Timiskaming District before entering Cochrane District, through which the remainder of the route passes. Classified as a city, accelerated development has occurred progressively in the western portion of the municipality , with the urban portion located in the centre of the city. Through the urban portion, Highway 101 is not maintained as a provincial highway and is a local road.

East of Gervais Street North, Highway 101 travels northeast to Hoyle, passing beside several large open pit mines on the outskirts of Timmins. It then turn east and crosses the Frederick House River on the northern shores of Night Hawk Lake. The route passes through the only agricultural area along its journey, travelling straight for the remainder of the distance to Highway 11 west of Matheson. After a  concurrency with Highway 11, Highway 101 branches north into Matheson, where it crosses the  Black River before curving east. Returning to wilderness, the route zig-zags towards the Ontario–Quebec border near Rouyn-Noranda, travelling several kilometres south of Lake Abitibi. The roadway continues eastward as Quebec Route 388 into the Abitibi-Témiscamingue region. With the exception of an undivided urban four lane section through Timmins, from Government Road in Mountjoy to Gervais Road South in Porcupine, the entire highway is two lanes wide.

History 
Highway 67 was the first provincial highway to provide access to Timmins from the Ferguson Highway (Highway 11). When it was designated in mid-1937,
shortly after the merging of the Department of Northern Development into the Department of Highways (DHO), several other roads had been "built" in the area, but hardly improved beyond the clearing of trees. The DHO set forth to construct several new highways in the north.
A concession road between Hoyle and Matheson already existed at this point, and over the next several years it was reconstructed to provincial standards. On June 26, 1940, the route was designated as a provincial highway. However, it was not numbered on official maps.

During World War II, plans arose to connect Timmins with the Quebec border, and the route via Matheson was chosen as the most direct path. By the end of the war, the road between Hoyle and Matheson had been numbered as Highway 101 and extended eastward to Abitibi, ending at Garrison Creek.
The route remained this way for several years.

The Trans-Canada Highway Act was passed in 1950 and provided the impetus to construct Highway 17 around Lake Superior, which was carried out over the course of the decade.
This resulted in the planning of a new road to connect Highway 11 with Highway 17; it was decided that Highway 101 would be extended west as the new connector highway. In order to accommodate this future extension, the section of Highway 67 between Timmins and Hoyle was renumbered as Highway 101 in mid-1955.
On September 1, 1955, the route was extended west of Timmins to Warren Lake.
West of Warren Lake, Highway 616 and Highway 624 continued to the CNR stop in Foleyet; these would soon become part of Highway 101.
Highway 101 was opened to the Quebec border in December 1958 with the completion of the final  gap. In addition, work began on December 18 to clear the route of the Foleyet to Chapleau Resource Road.
On April 1, 1960, Highway 616 and Highway 624 were renumbered as part of Highway 101,

In 1963, several new sections of Highway 101 were opened. On May 16, the majority of the new Chapleau–Foleyet road was designated as Highway 101, with the exception of a  bypass of Foleyet and the old route of Highway 624 that opened on December 19.
In addition, a new  road west of Chapleau was assumed in December, terminating at the Grazing River near the present entrance to The Shoals Provincial Park.

Work also progressed from the west, near Wawa. Prior to the opening of Highway 17 and Highway 101, a road connected the port at Michipicoten with Wawa. Highway 101 follows a portion of this route, but south of the Highway 17 junction the old road is now known as Pinewood Drive. In October 1965, a  road was designated as Highway 101, travelling as far east as the Michipicoten River, The final section, a gap between the Michipicoten River bridge and the Grazing River, opened to traffic on January 1, 1967, completing the link between Wawa and Timmins.

A  segment of Highway 101 was transferred to the City of Timmins on April 1, 1997 as part of a province-wide downloading program.
This portion is now locally maintained and is known as Riverside Drive in the Mountjoy area, Algonquin Boulevard downtown, Schumacher Drive in Schumacher, Harold Avenue in South Porcupine and King Street in Porcupine.

Major intersections

References 

101
101
101
101